Munising is a city in Alger County in the U.S. state of Michigan.  The population was 2,355 at the 2010 census.  It is the county seat of Alger County. The city is partially surrounded by Munising Township, but the two are administered autonomously.

Located on the southern shore of Lake Superior in the Upper Peninsula, it serves as the western gateway to Pictured Rocks National Lakeshore.

History
The name for the city comes from the Ojibwe word minisiing, "at the island". A post office was established as the Munising post office on December 22, 1868. It was renamed as Gogarnville on October 23, 1889, when Julius Gogarn was appointed as postmaster. The office was moved to his farm. He was a German-born American Civil War veteran and first Supervisor of Munising Township. That post office continued until July 15, 1893.

Geography
It is the primary embarkation point for cruises to Pictured Rocks National Lakeshore and Grand Island National Recreation Area. Grand Island is located one half mile north in Munising Bay.

The Munising area has many waterfalls including Alger Falls, Horseshoe Falls, Memorial Falls, Munising Falls, Miners Falls, Scott Falls, Tannery Falls and Wagner Falls.

Climate
Munising has a warm-summer humid continental climate (Köppen Dfb) with cool to warm summers coupled with cold winters with heavy lake-effect snowfall.

Demographics

2010 census
As of the census of 2010, there were 2,355 people, 1,032 households, and 592 families living in the city. The racial makeup of the city was 91.2% White, 0.2% African American, 4.8% Native American, 0.7% Asian, 0.2% from other races, and 3.0% from two or more races. Hispanic or Latino of any race were 1.4% of the population.

There were 1,032 households, of which 22.9% had children under the age of 18 living with them, 42.0% were married couples living together, 11.0% had a female householder with no husband present, 4.4% had a male householder with no wife present, and 42.6% were non-families. 37.9% of all households were made up of individuals, and 20.2% had someone living alone who was 65 years of age or older. The average household size was 2.13 and the average family size was 2.76.

The median age in the city was 48.6 years. 18.7% of residents were under the age of 18; 6% were between the ages of 18 and 24; 20.5% were from 25 to 44; 28.4% were from 45 to 64; and 26.3% were 65 years of age or older. The gender makeup of the city was 47.4% male and 52.6% female.

2000 census
As of the census of 2000, there were 2,539 people, 1,115 households, and 654 families living in the city. The racial makeup of the city was 93.74% White, 0.16% African American, 3.51% Native American, 0.67% Asian, 0.12% Pacific Islander, 0.08% from other races, and 1.73% from two or more races. Hispanic or Latino of any race were 0.98% of the population. 13.3% were of French, 12.4% German, 11.0% Finnish, 9.9% Polish, 8.8% Swedish, 7.3% French Canadian and 6.8% Irish ancestry according to Census 2000. 97.8% spoke English and 1.6% Spanish as their first language.

There were 1,115 households, out of which 24.4% had children under the age of 18 living with them, 44.8% were married couples living together, 10.2% had a female householder with no husband present, and 41.3% were non-families. 36.3% of all households were made up of individuals, and 19.5% had someone living alone who was 65 years of age or older.  The average household size was 2.17 and the average family size was 2.82.

In the city, the population was spread out, with 21.4% under the age of 18, 6.6% from 18 to 24, 23.5% from 25 to 44, 23.4% from 45 to 64, and 25.1% who were 65 years of age or older.  The median age was 44 years. For every 100 females, there were 88.8 males.  For every 100 females age 18 and over, there were 82.9 males.

The median income for a household in the city was $33,899, and the median income for a family was $46,133. Males had a median income of $41,333 versus $24,444 for females. The per capita income for the city was $19,779.  About 7.4% of families and 11.4% of the population were below the poverty line, including 11.6% of those under age 18 and 10.1% of those age 65 or over.

Transportation
 travels west to Marquette and east to Sault Ste. Marie.
 travels westerly through Chatham toward Sawyer International Airport south of Marquette, and southerly to Manistique.
 runs from H-58 just east of the city to Miner's Castle within Pictured Rocks National Lakeshore.
, a north-south route, terminates at H-58 in the eastern part of the city.
 begins in downtown Munising and continues northeasterly through Pictured Rocks National Lakeshore.

Notable people
Connie Binsfeld, 60th Lieutenant Governor of Michigan
George Snow Hill, painter
Steven J. Raica, Roman Catholic priest, 5th Bishop of Gaylord, Michigan, 5th Bishop of Birmingham, Alabama
Brock Strom, professional football player
James Wickstrom, radio talk show host
Arthur DeLacy Wood, parole board chairperson

Gallery

References

Further reading
 Romig, Walter. Michigan Place Names. Wayne State University Press: Detroit, 1986.

External links

City of Munising official website
Munising Visitor's Bureau
Munising Area Tourism and Economic Development
Pictured Rocks National Lakeshore

Cities in Alger County, Michigan
County seats in Michigan
Michigan populated places on Lake Superior
Populated places established in 1896
1896 establishments in Michigan
Pictured Rocks National Lakeshore